The Russian-American classical virtuoso pianist Vladimir Horowitz was a recording artist for over 60 years; beginning in 1926 on a piano roll system for Welte-Mignon, then with audio recordings, starting in 1928 for the Victor Talking Machine Company, later RCA Victor. Horowitz continued to record for a variety of record labels throughout his life. Between 1962 and 1973 he recorded for Columbia Masterworks In 1975, Horowitz returned to RCA, with which he recorded a series of live recitals. For the last years of his life, between 1985 and 1989, Horowitz recorded for Deutsche Grammophon. Horowitz's final recording, with Sony Classical, was completed in November 1989, four days before his death. This final recording consisted of repertoire that he had never previously recorded.
His discography contains numerous albums and compilations of works by a variety of composers. Horowitz has also appeared in several video items, most of these were produced in the later years of his life.

Overview 

Horowitz's first recordings were made in 1926, on piano rolls at the Welte-Mignon studios in Freiburg im Breisgau, Germany. He also recorded piano rolls for Aeolian. His first audio recordings were made in the United States during 1928 for the Victor Talking Machine Company,  Because of a reduction of recording activities due to the economic impact of the Great Depression, RCA Victor agreed to allow its recording artists' European-produced recordings to be made by HMV, RCA Victor's London-based affiliate. Horowitz's first European recording, in 1930, was of Rachmaninoff's Piano Concerto No. 3 with Albert Coates and the London Symphony Orchestra, the world premiere recording of that piece. Through 1936, Horowitz continued to make recordings for HMV of solo piano repertoire, including his famous 1932 account of Liszt's Sonata in B minor. Beginning in 1940, Horowitz's recording activity was again concentrated in the U.S. That year, he recorded Brahms' Piano Concerto No. 2, and in 1941, Tchaikovsky's Piano Concerto No. 1, both with the NBC Symphony Orchestra under Arturo Toscanini. With the creation of the LP in the late 1940s, many of his older recordings were reissued in the new format and some items received multiple issues. During Horowitz's second retirement, which began in 1953, he made a series of recordings in his New York townhouse, including LPs of Scriabin and Clementi. Horowitz's first stereo recording, made in 1959, was devoted to two of Beethoven's piano sonatas.

In 1962, Horowitz embarked on a series of highly acclaimed recordings for Columbia Masterworks, which was later renamed to Sony Classical after the label was purchased by Sony in 1990. The most famous among them are his 1965 return concert at Carnegie Hall and a 1968 recording from his television special, Vladimir Horowitz: A Concert at Carnegie Hall, televised by CBS. Horowitz also continued to make studio recordings, including a 1969 recording of Kreisleriana by Robert Schumann, which was awarded the Prix Mondial du Disque. All of Horowitz's Columbia recordings were released as a 13-CD set by Sony Masterworks in 1993. In 1975, Horowitz returned to RCA, releasing a series of live recordings until 1982. During this period, Columbia also repackaged their Horowitz recordings with reissues including the named Beethoven Sonatas and multiple-LP sets of Chopin. In 1985, Horowitz signed with Deutsche Grammophon, and made both studio and live recordings until 1989, including his only recording of Mozart's Piano Concerto No. 23. Four filmed documents were made during this time, including the telecast of his April 20, 1986 Moscow recital. His final recording, for Sony Classical, was completed four days before his death and consisted of repertoire he had never previously recorded.

With the advent of the Compact Disc, the various labels for which Horowitz recorded began reissuing his pre-digital recordings. This began in the mid-1980s and increased in the years immediately following Horowitz's death. Beginning in 1987, Columbia issued single-composer compilations drawn from various albums. RCA Victor issued many of Horowitz's recordings on their Gold Seal mid-priced label. By 1993, both Columbia's and RCA's entire cache of previously issued recordings was available on CD, including several older items which had never appeared on LP. A number of items were issued more than once, including the 1978 recording of Rachmaninoff's Piano Concerto No. 3 which was issued on CD in 1987, again in 1993, with a new cover, and in a new remastering in 2000. Over the past two decades, several previously unavailable Horowitz recordings have been issued. These include studio and live recordings from the Columbia era, and a collection from Carnegie Hall recitals between 1945 and 1951 which were recorded privately by Horowitz. In addition, several smaller labels have issued CDs made from bootleg recordings from the 1960s onward and several of Horowitz's stereo recordings have been issued in the blu-spec and SHM-CD (Super High Material) formats.

The listing below only contains Compact Disc releases and does not contain 78rpm, LP, Cassette, or 8-track tape releases. The videography includes items which have been released on VHS, Laserdisc and DVD.

Albums

Compilations

Boxed sets

Video releases 

Horowitz's first appearance on television was a one-hour recital for the CBS television network in 1968.  The pianist also performed at the White House in 1978, celebrating the 50th Anniversary of his American debut with an all-Chopin recital from the East Room. Although never officially released on home video, copies of the recital are available from the Jimmy Carter Library. Horowitz's debut in Japan, in 1983, was broadcast on Japanese public television. The pianist was under the influence of anti-depressant medication, which severely impaired his playing and led to a withdrawal from performance until 1985. Although clips of the recital have appeared on the internet, no material from this time period has been seen on any documentaries. In addition, Horowitz can be seen on various news shows including a 1977 60 Minutes story.

References 
 General

 
 

 Specific

External links 
 Vladimir Horowitz at Discogs
 [ Vladimir Horowitz] at Allmusic
 Vladimir Horowitz discography at Rolling Stone
 The Vladimir Horowitz Website with complete discography

Vladimir Horowitz
Discographies of classical pianists